Vision+ is an Indonesian over-the-top video streaming service owned by MNC Group. Established on 15 January 2020, Vision+ service's content consists of video on demand contents (original titles, TV dramas and shows, films), free-to-air and premium channels (including international channels) and livestreaming events & sports.

References

External links 
 

2020 establishments in Indonesia
Internet properties established in 2020
Indonesian entertainment websites
Media Nusantara Citra
Smart TV
Subscription video on demand services
Video on demand services